Robert Edward Lee (July 4, 1935 - March 4, 2017) was an American football player who played with the Boston Patriots. He played college football at the University of Missouri. After college, Lee went into the American Football League for the 1960 season with the Patriots. He died on March 4, 2017, at the age of 81.

References

1935 births
2017 deaths
Hickman High School alumni
American football guards
Missouri Tigers football players
Boston Patriots players
Players of American football from Missouri
Burials at Memorial Park Cemetery (Columbia, Missouri)